Raymond Joseph Wieczorek (December 9, 1928 – November 22, 2022) was an American businessman and politician from Manchester, New Hampshire. A Republican, he was mayor of the city from 1990 to 2000, and represented District 4 on the Executive Council of New Hampshire from 2002 to 2012.

Career 
Wieczorek was the director and president of the Manchester Scholarship Foundation between 1973 and 1976. He became commissioner of the Manchester Housing and Redevelopment Authority in 1984, and was its chairman from 1986 to 1989.

He served five terms as mayor of Manchester in the 1990s. He won his first term in 1989 when he defeated incumbent Democrat Emile Beaulieu, who was seeking re-election.

Wieczorek was defeated in the 1999 election by his Democratic challenger, Robert A. Baines.

Wieczorek ran for Council to replace Republican Thomas Colantuono, who had resigned after being appointed United States Attorney for New Hampshire. Wieczorek defeated the Democratic nominee, state Rep. John Kacavas, and was elected to the Council in 2002.  

He is best known for the redevelopment of the Amoskeag Millyard, the development of the Manchester-Boston Regional Airport, the conversion of the city budget to fiscal year from a calendar year, and the creation of a downtown Manchester civic center. The access road to the Manchester–Boston Regional Airport, Raymond Wieczorek Drive, is named after him.

Personal life and death 
Wieczorek was a Korean War veteran, having served in the U.S. Army. He was a member of the American Legion and Veterans of Foreign Wars, and owner of the Wieczorek Insurance Agency. He was married twice, first to Catherine Connare and then to Susan Kramas, who died in 2008. He had three children.

In 2001, Wieczorek was awarded an honorary Doctor of Law from New Hampshire College (now Southern New Hampshire University).

Wieczorek died at Catholic Medical Center in Manchester on November 22, 2022, aged 93, after a period of declining health.

References

External links
 Campaign website
 Page on NH.gov

1928 births
2022 deaths
20th-century American businesspeople
20th-century American politicians
21st-century American politicians
American businesspeople in insurance
Businesspeople from New Hampshire
Mayors of Manchester, New Hampshire
Members of the Executive Council of New Hampshire
Military personnel from Connecticut
New Hampshire Republicans
Politicians from New Britain, Connecticut
Southern New Hampshire University alumni
United States Army personnel of the Korean War